Alabonia is a genus of gelechioid moths. Here, it is placed within the subfamily Oecophorinae of the concealer moth family (Oecophoridae). Alternatively it has been placed in the Elachistidae or Depressariinae together with its presumed closest relatives. It has also been proposed to separate Alabonia and closely related genera as a subfamily Enicostominae (after the junior synonym of Alabonia), but this has generally not been followed by recent authors regardless of where they placed the present genus.

Species include:
 Alabonia chapmani Walsingham,  1903
 Alabonia geoffrella
 Alabonia herculeella Walsingham, 1903
 Alabonia staintoniella (Zeller, 1850)
 Alabonia superior Rebel, 1917

Junior synonyms of Alabonia are:
 Enicostoma Stephens, 1829
 Henicostoma Agassiz, 1847 (unjustified emendation)

Footnotes

References
  (2004): Butterflies and Moths of the World, Generic Names and their Type-species – Alabonia. Version of 2004-NOV-05. Retrieved 2010-APR-27.
  (2001): Markku Savela's Lepidoptera and some other life forms – Alabonia. Version of 2001-NOV-07. Retrieved 2010-APR-27.

Oecophorinae